Fênix 2005 Futebol Clube, commonly known as Fênix, is a Brazilian football club based in Barra Mansa, Rio de Janeiro state.

History
The club was founded on September 9, 2005. They finished as the runners-up in the Campeonato Carioca Third level in 2009, losing the competition to Sampaio Corrêa.

Stadium
Fênix 2005 Futebol Clube play their home games at Estádio Raulino de Oliveira. The stadium has a maximum capacity of 20,000 people.

References

Association football clubs established in 2005
Football clubs in Rio de Janeiro (state)
2005 establishments in Brazil